Edward Charles Halper (born March 16, 1951) is an American philosopher and Distinguished Research Professor and Josiah Meigs Distinguished Teaching Professor at University of Georgia. He is a former president of the Metaphysical Society of America (2012). He specializes in ancient Greek philosophy and Hegel, and he is especially known for his multi-volume commentary on Aristotle's Metaphysics.

References

20th-century American philosophers
Philosophy academics
1951 births
Presidents of the Metaphysical Society of America
Living people
University of Toronto alumni